Ryan Thomas Eyre Bower (born 25 February 1991) is an English professional rugby union player for Dallas Jackals in the US competition Major League Rugby. He has played for Leicester Tigers, Worcester Warriors and London Irish in Premiership Rugby, and for Nottingham in the RFU Championship.  Bower's principal position is loosehead prop.

Club career
Bower made his Leicester Tigers debut against the Ospreys in LV= Cup at Bridgend in November 2010. As well as working with the senior squad at Welford Road, he played on loan with Nottingham in the RFU Championship in both 2011-12 and 2012-13 seasons. On 29 April 2014, Bower signed a permanent deal with Worcester Warriors from the 2014-15 season.

On 6 August 2020, Bower re-signed with Leicester Tigers ahead of the 2020-21 season, but after four appearances was released on 16 June 2021.

He joined London Irish as a short term signing on 25 August 2021, the length of the deal was not disclosed.  In 2022 Bower joined the Dallas Jackals in Major League Rugby for their inaugural season.

International career
Bower made his England Under-20s debut against Wales U20s in the 2011 Six Nations Under 20s Championship. He was also part of England for the 2011 IRB Junior World Championship. He was part of a RFU Championship XV team that defeated Canada 28-23 as part of their  2014 autumn tests, which was held at the Sixways Stadium in Worcester.

References

External links
Worcester Warriors Profile
Leicester Tigers Profile

1991 births
Living people
English rugby union players
Leicester Tigers players
Rugby union players from Nuneaton
Rugby union props
Worcester Warriors players
Nottingham R.F.C. players
London Irish players
Dallas Jackals players